Wanda Cannon (born January 12, 1960) is a Canadian actress and theatre director. She is most noted for her performance in the 1993 film For the Moment, for which she received a Genie Award nomination for Best Supporting Actress at the 15th Genie Awards in 1994.

Early life 
Cannon was born in Kitchener, Ontario, and raised primarily in Saskatchewan.

Career 
Cannon got her start as a musical theatre actress, and has continued to act and direct theatre throughout her career. Her other film roles have included The Last Winter, Overdrawn at the Memory Bank, The 6th Day and The Final Cut. Cannon appear in regular television roles as Stephanie Clements in My Secret Identity and as Valerie Stanton in Heartland.

Filmography

Film

Television

References

External links

1960 births
20th-century Canadian actresses
21st-century Canadian actresses
Canadian television actresses
Canadian film actresses
Canadian musical theatre actresses
Canadian stage actresses
Canadian theatre directors
Actresses from Saskatchewan
Actresses from Kitchener, Ontario
Living people